Cyclic AMP-dependent transcription factor ATF-7 is a protein that in humans is encoded by the ATF7 gene.

Homonym 

In 2001, Peters et al. published a paper showing that ATF-7, a Novel bZIP Protein, interacts with PTP4A1.
This ATF-7 is actually ATF5 and not ATF7, as noted by the authors at the end of their paper ("Note Added in Proof—While this manuscript was under review, sequences for mouse and human ATF-5 were deposited in GenBankTM. It appears that ATF-7 and ATF-5 are likely to be the same protein. In addition, an unrelated sequence named ATF7 has also been deposited in GenBankTM. In order to avoid confusion, future work on the protein described in this publication will likely refer to it as either ATF-5 or ATF-5/7.")

References

Further reading

External links 
 
 

Transcription factors